Jarrad Irons (born 20 September 1992) is a former professional Australian rules footballer who played for the Port Adelaide Football Club in the Australian Football League (AFL). He was drafted with the 50th selection in the 2011 rookie draft. He made his AFL debut in round 1, 2011.

He is the son of Steve Irons who is the Liberal member of the Australian House of Representatives for the electoral division of Swan in Western Australia.

References

External links

WAFL playing statistics

Living people
1992 births
Port Adelaide Football Club players
Port Adelaide Football Club players (all competitions)
Perth Football Club players
Australian rules footballers from Western Australia